RFG may refer to:
 Retail Food Group, an Australian company
 Reformulated gasoline
 Rooke Field airfield in Refugio, Texas, US. See  list of airports in Texas
 RFG Taube, a German monoplane c1910
 Regional Football Groups, in Regional Amateur Football Groups (Bulgaria)